Casinaria is a genus of parasitoid wasps belonging to the family Ichneumonidae.

The genus was first described by Holmgren in 1859.

The genus has cosmopolitan distribution.

Species:
 Casinaria morionella Holmgren, 1860

References

Campopleginae
Ichneumonidae genera